Daniel Jose Cigogna (born 8 November 1982) is an Argentine footballer. He plays in Honduras with Olimpia.

Cigogna began his career with local club Quilmes Atlético Club after loan spells with Universitario de Deportes and Atlético Rafaela and a stint in Bolivia with Unión Central he played in the lower divisions of Argentine football with Los Andes, Estudiantes (BA), Sarmiento and Talleres (RE). In 2009, he moved to Honduras and joined CD Olimpia.

External links
 Argentine Primera statistics  
 

1982 births
Living people
Footballers from Santa Fe, Argentina
Argentine footballers
Atlético de Rafaela footballers
Quilmes Atlético Club footballers
Club Atlético Los Andes footballers
Estudiantes de Buenos Aires footballers
Talleres de Remedios de Escalada footballers
Club Universitario de Deportes footballers
C.D. Olimpia players
Expatriate footballers in Peru
Expatriate footballers in Bolivia
Expatriate footballers in Honduras
Liga Nacional de Fútbol Profesional de Honduras players
Club Atlético Sarmiento footballers
Argentine expatriate sportspeople in Bolivia
Unión Tarija players
Association football forwards